Qurdlar (also, Kurtlar) is a village and municipality in the Barda Rayon of Azerbaijan.  It has a population of 296.

References

Populated places in Barda District